John Cutbush (born 28 June 1949) is an English retired professional footballer who played as a right back. Cutbush was active in both England and the United States, and made over 250 career league appearances.

Career
Born in Malta, Cutbush began his career in England with the youth team of Tottenham Hotspur. Cutbush never made a league appearance at Tottenham, and later played for Fulham, with whom he played in the 1975 FA Cup Final, and Sheffield United in the Football League, before moving to the United States to play indoor soccer with the Wichita Wings.

References

External links

1949 births
Living people
English footballers
Tottenham Hotspur F.C. players
Fulham F.C. players
Sheffield United F.C. players
English Football League players
Association football defenders
Wichita Wings (MISL) players
FA Cup Final players